The 2021 European Mountain Bike Championships was the 32nd edition of the European Mountain Bike Championships, an annual mountain biking competition organized by the Union Européenne de Cyclisme (UEC). The championships comprised six disciplines: downhill, cross-country cycling (XC), cross-country marathon (XCM), cross-country ultra-marathon, cross-country eliminator (XCE), and beach race.

Dates and venues
 Evolène : 20 June (cross-country marathon)
 Vielha : 26 June (cross-country ultra-marathon)
 Maribor : 6–8 August (downhill)
 Novi Sad : 12–15 August (cross-country, cross-country eliminator, team relay)
 Dunkirk : 12 December (beach race)

Medal summary

Cross-country

Cross-country eliminator

Cross-country marathon

Cross-country ultra-marathon

Team Relay

Downhill

Beachrace

References

European Mountain Bike Championships
European Mountain Bike Championships
European Mountain Bike Championships
European Mountain Bike Championships
European Mountain Bike Championships
European Mountain Bike Championships
European Mountain Bike Championships
International sports competitions hosted by Switzerland
International sports competitions hosted by Spain
International sports competitions hosted by France
International sports competitions hosted by Serbia
International sports competitions hosted by Slovenia
European Mountain Bike Championships
European Mountain Bike Championships
European Mountain Bike Championships
European Mountain Bike Championships
European Mountain Bike Championships